Manon Lescaut is an opera or opéra comique in three acts by Daniel Auber to a libretto by Eugène Scribe, and, like Puccini's Manon Lescaut and Massenet's Manon, is based on the Abbé Prévost's novel Manon Lescaut (1731). Auber's version is nowadays the least-performed of the three.

Performance history 
The opera was premiered on 23 February 1856 by the Opéra-Comique at the second Salle Favart in Paris. It was the first work to be staged by that company that did not have a happy ending. It was staged in Liège in 1875, revived at the Opéra-Comique in 1882, and regularly performed in Germany as well as France. However, since the dawn of the twentieth century stagings have become something of a rarity.

In North America, the opera was performed in 2006 by the Lyric Opera of Los Angeles at the Los Angeles Theatre.

In 1990, it was staged at the Opéra Comique de Paris with the Picardy Sinfonietta in Amiens conducted by Patrick Fournillier. Next year the live recording of the opera was released by the French label Le Chant du Monde. Another stage performance took place at the Wexford Festival in October/November, 2002.

Roles

Synopsis 
The story only loosely resembles the original novel by Prévost (where, for instance, Lescaut is Manon's brother, not her cousin).  There is one character – the Marquis d'Herigny – who represents the several wealthy suitors that Manon became involved with in the novel.  Some other characters are absent entirely, and others are completely new to this telling of the story.

Music 
The role of Manon Lescaut is a demanding one, with a very high tessitura, extended florid passages and arias of outstanding technical difficulty. Nonetheless, it also presents great opportunities for characterisation and (at least before the appearance of the operas on the same subject by Puccini and Massenet) was one of the staples of the operatic repertoire – not only in France, but also in Germany. The role of the Marquis d'Herigny, written for the famous baritone, Jean-Baptiste Faure, also features several significant solos; but the tenor role of Des Grieux (given two major arias by Massenet and three by Puccini) lacks a major solo, although the character does participate in a series of fine duets, notably at the death of Manon near the end of the opera.

One number in the score has retained its popularity with coloratura sopranos.  This is Manon's solo, "", also known as "" or the "Laughing Song". It is not a free-standing aria – in fact, it forms part of the act 1 finale – but ever since its creation it has been a chosen showcase for the technique of singers such as Adelina Patti (who sang it during the lesson scene in The Barber of Seville), Amelita Galli-Curci, Joan Sutherland and Edita Gruberová.

Recordings
 Manon Lescaut – Mady Mesplé, Jean-Claude Orliac, Yves Bisson – Choeurs et orchestre lyrique de Radio France, Jean-Pierre Marty (conductor) – EMI (recorded in October 1974).
 Manon Lescaut – Elizabeth Vidal, Alain Gabriel, René Massis – Les Choeurs du Théâtre Français de la Musique, the Orchestre Régional de Picardie Le Sinfonietta, Patrick Fournillier (conductor) – Le Chant du Monde (recorded live in 1990, released in 1991).

References
Notes 

Sources
, Annals of Opera, 1597–1940. London, John Calder, 1978

External links

, Joan Sutherland (audio)
, Elizabeth Vidal (staged)

Adaptations of works by Antoine François Prévost
French-language operas
Opéras comiques
Operas by Daniel Auber
Operas
1856 operas
Opera world premieres at the Opéra-Comique
Operas based on novels
Libretti by Eugène Scribe